The Bernard Wetzel Building is a historic commercial building in downtown Carmel-by-the-Sea, California. It is an example of Spanish Eclectic Revival style architecture. The building qualified as an important building in the city's downtown historic district property survey and was registered with the California Register of Historical Resources on September 7, 2004. The building has been occupied by Whittakers since 1989.

History

The Bernard Wetzel Building was established in 1906 by Courland J. Arne, Carmel's first barber. The original building had a canvas roof and was on Lot 5. In 1916, when the city was incorporated, Carmelites came to Arne's barber shop to sign the incorporation petition. In May 1923, owner Bernard Wetzel moved the barber shop ten feet to the adjoining lot to make way for the Bank of Carmel. Franklin Devendorf, Frank Powers, Sam Powers, came out to watch M. J. Murphy move the building. Wetzel replaced Arne's tent with a board-and-batten building.

The Bernard Wetzel Building is a one-and-one-half story, concrete block Spanish Eclectic Revival style commercial building, located on Ocean Avenue, between San Carlos and Dolores Streets, in Carmel-by-the-Sea, California. The exterior walls are textured in cement stucco. The roof has a low-pitched roof with Mission tile. The building is entered through a dutch door. There are two small, square windows covered by wrought iron grilles. The store is narrow and long with a small garden in the back. 

In 1923, the building also housed the shoeshine stand of African-American Rutherford Hayes Walker, who had come to the Monterey Peninsula in 1906 as a chef for the Centrella Hotel and Hotel Del Mar in Pacific Grove, California.

In 1928, Major W. J. Hairs founded the Merle's Treasure Chest in the building. At the same time, Wetzel commissioned English designer and builder Frederick Bigland to design and construct the Spanish Eclectic style building. In the 1950s and 60s, the shop became the Bib'n Tucker shop, a children's clothing store. Ernest and Willa Aylaian are the current owners of the building. The building has been occupied by Whittakers since 1989, which is a gourmet kitchen and garden shop.

The building qualified for inclusion in the city's Downtown Historic District Property Survey, and was registered with the California Register of Historical Resources on September 7, 2004. The building qualifies under the California Register criterion 1, in history as the site of Courland J. Ame's barber shop, and criterion 3 in architecture, as a good example of Spanish Eclectic Revival style and the only known commercial building, in the downtown district, designed and constructed by designer and builder, Frederick Bigland.

Frederick Bigland

Frederick Bigland (1889-1971) came to Carmel from England in the early 1920s. He became a builder and designer in Northern England. He left England and settled in Carmel in the 1920s. He built his own Storybook Tudor style "Forest Cottage" (Frederick Bigland House) home on Mountain View Avenue and Santa Rita Street in Carmel for $1,500 in 1926. 

His work in Carmel reflected his own English Tudor storybook style he brought with him from England. He built the "Twe Kenn" house for Clara Folger on Scenic Drive in 1926.

Works
   

Bigland married Dorothy Walton (1884-1961) and had only one child, Mary Bigland (1914-1984), who married a blind lawyer, Eben Whittlesey, who went on to serve Carmel as mayor from 1962 to 1964.

Bigland retired in 1961 and moved to Solvang, California. He died on December 12, 1971, at age of 82, in Santa Barbara, California after a short illness. Funeral services and interment were at the Santa Barbara Cemetery.

See also
 Carmel-by-the-Sea, California

References

External links

 Downtown Conservation District Historic Property Survey
 Whittakers

1916 establishments in California
Carmel-by-the-Sea, California
Buildings and structures in Monterey County, California
Spanish Colonial Revival architecture in California